Matta is a town in Swat District, Khyber Pakhtunkhwa Province, Pakistan.

References

Ahmad, H. 1998. Sociopolitical Changes and Agroforestry Development: A working paper on vegetation dynamics of Swat Valley Pakistan.

Populated places in Swat District